or An account of the ways of the gods in Ryūkyū is a five-volume treatise of c. 1605/6 by the Jōdo-sect Japanese priest  (1552–1639), who lived in Naha from 1603 to 1606. Unlike most Okinawan literature, it predates the Satsuma invasion of 1609. A woodblock print edition was published in Kyoto in 1648.

The five volumes traverse Indian and Chinese Buddhism before turning to the religions of the Ryūkyū Kingdom. The work includes the earliest extant version of the Ryūkyūan creation myth as well as the first account of Minamoto no Tametomo coming to Okinawa and there siring the future King Shunten.

See also
 List of Cultural Properties of Japan - writings (Okinawa)
 Ryukyuan religion
 Chūzan Seikan
 Honji suijaku

References

Japanese chronicles
Ryukyu Kingdom
Religion in the Ryukyu Islands
Important Cultural Properties of Japan
1605 books
1606 books
Shinbutsu shūgō
Shinto texts
History books about Buddhism